Shag, also known as rolling tobacco or loose tobacco is fine-cut tobacco, used to make self-made cigarettes by hand rolling the tobacco into rolling paper or injecting it into filter tubes. It got its name from the finely cut strands appearing like 'shag' fabric and was originally considered poor quality. Various types of cut are used; most shag blends use a simple mixture of cutting styles, consisting mostly of loose cut but also krumble kake, ribbon cut and flake may be used. Some shag blends use cuts reminiscent of pipe tobacco.  These were imported to the United Kingdom by Rory Innes following the Virginia tobacco plantations in North America. 

A cigarette made with shag tobacco may be called a rollie, a roll-up/dole-up or hand-rolled. The flat bags in which shag is typically packaged for commercial sale are often called tobacco pouches. Oppositely, pre-processed and packaged cigarettes may be referred to colloquially as tailor-mades, TMs, tailies or straights.

Shag styles
There are several shag blends or tobacco styles using different tobaccos, curing techniques and cutting types. Sometimes additives like sugar, glycerol and fruit flavors are added.

American shag is typically a mixture of domestic and/or imported tobacco and air cured Burley.
Virginia or Light blends are mainly made up of Virginia tobacco.
Smooth adds Georgia tobaccos to a Light blend.
Halfzware, meaning "half heavy" in Dutch, is a combination of Light and Zware shag, nowadays called Stevige or Volle.
Turkish is a blend that mainly consists of Turkish Tobaccos like Yenidje, Samsun, Bafra etc.
Zware, meaning "heavy" in Dutch, consists mainly of fire cured Kentucky, Latakia and air cured Paraguay.

Netherlands
Shag tobacco has always had a high market-share in the Dutch tobacco-market, although it is declining. In 1989 some 53% of the combined shag and cigarette market was for shag-tobacco while in 2010 it was about 42%. Smoking shag is cheaper than smoking ready-made cigarettes. The price of a standard pouch tobacco (originally 50 grams, now often 42.5 grams) is about the same as a packet of cigarettes. As the average self-rolled cigarette will contain less than one gram of tobacco often 50 or more cigarettes are rolled from a pouch for nearly the same price as 19 or 20 ready-made cigarettes, though not accounting for the cost of rolling paper and filters.

Besides the hand rolled cigarette using brands like Drum, Samson or Van Nelle, many people also smoke homemade cigarettes: with the help of a special tool they fill empty tubes with tobacco. The longer pieces of tobacco used for shag are not ideal for this use. For these smokers many (smaller) tobacco companies sell tobacco that resembles the type that is used for cigarettes: it is cut in much smaller pieces and is also "drier" than the normal shag. This "home cigarette" tobacco comes in packs or drums of 200 gram. Although the same tobacco-firms produce both shag as well as this "cigarette" tobacco it isn't sold under the name of their major brand-names.

Production 
The three main producers of shag-tobacco are Van Nelle, Drum and Niemeyer - where Van Nelle and Drum are both part of Imperial Tobacco since Sara Lee sold their tobacco interests, while Niemeyer is a subsidiary of British American Tobacco. Six of the top 10 brands of shag tobacco are brands of these two companies, while three of the remaining brands are "economy" brands sold in some of the large discount supermarkets.

Cultural references
The fictional detective Sherlock Holmes frequently solved crimes whilst smoking as much as a pound of shag tobacco, as in 'The Hound of the Baskervilles'

In his song, 'Under Me Sensi' (released in the UK in 1984), Barrington Levy disabuses a police officer that he is not smoking marijuana by explaining that he only smokes cigarettes and "shag". 

Irish singer-songwriter Gavin Friday's 1995 album was titled Shag Tobacco.

In the British sitcom Only Fools and Horses the character Uncle Albert claims to smoke his own recipe of "Navy shag and Dutch tobacco".

See also
 Roll-your-own cigarette
 Rolling paper

References

Tobacco
Tobacciana